KLJR-FM (96.7 MHz "La Mejor") is a radio station that is licensed to Santa Paula, California and broadcasts to the Oxnard–Ventura radio market. The station is owned by Radio Lazer and airs a regional Mexican music format.

History

Early years
The station went on the air as KAAP-FM in 1976 with an adult contemporary format. In 1982 it became album rock outlet KKBZ-FM ("The Buzz") before flipping to soft rock four years later as KIEZ. After being sold in 1989, KIEZ became KXPT ("The Point"), switching to smooth jazz.

On August 10, 1990, KXPT changed its call letters to KXBS and adopted an oldies format called "The Bus 96.7". In 1995, the station began airing a short-lived alternative rock format.

In April 1997, KXBS flipped to Spanish adult contemporary.

Radio Lazer era (1997–present)
In November 1997, Lazer Broadcasting purchased KXBS for $1 million, retaining the Spanish AC format. The station's callsign changed to KCZN on September 18, 1998 to match the new "Corazon" branding.

KCZN adopted the current call letters, regional Mexican format, and slogan in 2004, switching to KLJR-FM on September 2.

KLJR-FM has one booster station, KLJR-FM1 in Ventura, also broadcasting on a frequency of 96.7 MHz.

References

External links
FCC History Cards for KLJR-FM

LJR-FM
Santa Paula, California
LJR-FM
Radio stations established in 1976
1976 establishments in California